Nikola “Niki” Budalic (born August 1, 1978) is a Canadian retired soccer player who currently serves as a director of soccer operations for Inter Miami CF.

Club career
Budalic began his soccer career at the college level with the James Madison University. In 2001, he was selected by the Toronto Lynx in the first round of the USL A-League 2001 College Draft, but decided to continue his education back home at Wilfrid Laurier University where he led the Wilfrid Laurier Golden Hawks to the CIS championship. After the college season came to a conclusion he played with the Glen Shields Sun Devils in the Canadian Professional Soccer League.

In 2003, he signed a contract with the Toronto Lynx. He made his debut on April 20, 2002 against the Pittsburgh Riverhounds. He recorded his first goal on April 26, 2002 against Richmond Kickers in a 1-1 draw. In his rookie season he nearly helped the Lynx qualify for the postseason, but a tie in the final game of season against Atlanta Silverbacks made the Charlotte Eagles take the final playoff spot. He finished the season with twelve goals and was named Team of the Week three times. The club also recognized  him with their Best Offensive Player award, and was also named the A-League Rookie of the Year.

Just weeks before the start of the 2003 season the Lynx announced Budalic had been transferred to Örebro SK in the Swedish First Division, where he was re-united with former Lynx player Chris Pozniak. He was also named to the Canada national soccer team roster for a friendly against Germany, but did not feature in the match.

In 2004, he returned to Canada to sign with Montreal Impact. During his tenure with Montreal he had difficulty getting sufficient playing time with the competition of well-established strikers. He was later transferred to F.K. Haugesund where he helped the club win promotion to the Adeccoligaen in 2005. In 2006, he was released by Haugesund, which marked his return to Canada to sign with the Serbian White Eagles of the Canadian Soccer League. In his debut season he assisted the club in clinching the International Division title. He featured in the CSL Championship match against Italia Shooters, but lost the game to a score of 1-0.

He featured in the championship match against rivals Toronto Croatia, but suffered a 4-1 defeat on goals on aggregate. On September 17, 2007, Budalic played a game for the Toronto FC reserve team against the Real Salt Lake reserve team, and scored a goal in the 22nd minute. In 2008, he was named team captain of the Serbian White Eagles for the 2008 season.  He helped secure a postseason by finishing second in their division. In the playoffs, he recorded a goal in a 3-0 victory against Italia. For the third straight year he reached the championship final against the Trois-Rivières Attak, where Serbia claimed their first championship in a 2-1 victory in a penalty shootout.

In 2009, he assisted Serbia in securing their third division title and reached the championship final for the fourth time, but were defeated by the Attak in a penalty shootout. The following year he retired from competitive soccer in order to coach the White Eagles. He briefly returned to soccer in 2013 to play with K-W United FC in the USL Premier Development League.

Managerial career 
After his retirement from soccer he was appointed the head coach for the Serbian White Eagles.

Budalic served as director of soccer operations for K-W United, leading the team to the PDL championship in 2015. He was also an assistant coach for the women's and men's soccer teams at Wilfrid Laurier University and director of football for Beswicks Sports North America before joining Orlando City on 26 January 2016, as an assistant general manager, where he had to report directly to founder and president Phil Rawlins. On 14 December 2016, he was promoted to general manager, soccer operations at Orlando City, Orlando Pride and Orlando City B. He left the club in late November 2018.

Budalić then joined Inter Miami as a director of soccer operations on 8 January 2019.

Honours

Player
Serbian White Eagles
 CSL Championship: 2008
 Canadian Soccer League International Division: 2006, 2007, 2009

References

1978 births
Living people
Canadian people of Serbian descent
Canadian expatriate soccer players
Canadian expatriate sportspeople in Norway
Canadian expatriate sportspeople in Sweden
Canadian Soccer League (1998–present) players
Canadian soccer players
Expatriate footballers in Norway
Expatriate footballers in Sweden
FK Haugesund players
James Madison Dukes men's soccer players
Association football midfielders
Montreal Impact (1992–2011) players
Örebro SK players
USL League Two players
Soccer people from Ontario
Sportspeople from Kitchener, Ontario
Serbian White Eagles FC players
Serbian White Eagles FC managers
Toronto Lynx players
A-League (1995–2004) players
Wilfrid Laurier Golden Hawks soccer players
K-W United FC players
Canadian Soccer League (1998–present) managers
Allsvenskan players
York Region Shooters players
Canadian soccer coaches